Micić and Mićić, anglicized as Micic, are Serbian surnames. Notable people with these names include:

Micic
 Frank Micic (born 1940), Australian association football midfielder
 Rale Micic (born 1975), Serbian jazz guitarist and composer

Micić
 Nina Micić (born 1991), Serbian snowboarder
 Vasilije Micić (born 1994) Serbian basketball player

Mićić
 Branislav Mićić (born 1990), Swiss football defender
 Danijel Mićić (born 1988), Austrian football midfielder
 Dragan Mićić (born 1969), Serbian football coach and forward
 Dušan Mićić (born 1984), Serbian football midfielder
 Jordanka Belić (born 1964 as Mičić), Serbian and German chess grandmaster
 Marijana Mićić (born 1983), Serbian television host and actress
 Milica Mićić Dimovska (1947–2013), Serbian writer
 Nataša Mićić (born 1965), Serbian politician